Haysman is a surname. Notable people with the surname include:

 Kane Haysman (born 1995), English footballer
 Mike Haysman (born 1961), Australian-born South African cricket player and commentator

See also
 Hayman